Indonesia participated in the 2010 Asian Games in Guangzhou, China on 12–27 November 2010. Indonesia is one of eleven countries which have participated in the Asian games since the first Asian Games in 1951, and one of only ten countries that  have taken part in every Asian Games.

Indonesia sent 216 athletes (of whom 122 are men) which competed in 26 sports.

Competitors

Medals

Medal table

Medals by date

Medalists

Archery

Women

Athletics

Men

Women

Badminton

Men

Women

Mixed

Beach volleyball

Men

Bowling

Men

Women

Boxing

Men

Canoeing

Men

Women

Chess

Men

Women

Cue Sports

Men

Cycling

Road
Men

Women

Track
Women

Diving

Men

Women

Dragon Boat

Men
Team Member :
Ajurahman, Alkarman, Arifriyadi, Asnawir, Abdul Azis, Asep Hidayat, Iwan Husin, Jaslin, Marjuki, John Matulessy, Spens Mehue, Erwin Monim, Muchlis, Eka Octarorianus, Pendrota Putra Kusuma, Ikhwan Randi, Didin Rusdiana, Silo, Japerry Siregar, Andri Sugiarto, Ahmad Supriadi, Dedi Suyatno, Syarifuddin, Anwar Tarra.

Women
Team Member :
Wina Apriani, Sarce Aronggear, Dayumin, Astri Dwijayanti, Yulanda Entong, Farida, Raudani Fitra, Fitri Ayu, Hasnah, Tika Inderiyani, Yunita Kadop, Masripah, Minawati, Novita Sari, Ririn Nurfarida, Cici Paramida, Riska Ramadani, Rasima, Salwiah, Kanti Santyanti, Suhartati, Wahyni, Since Yom.

Fencing

Men

Women

Karate

Men

Women

Rowing

Men

Women

Sailing

Men

Women

Sepaktakraw

Shooting

Women

Swimming

Men

Taekwondo

Men

Women

Tennis

Women

Volleyball

Indoor

Men's Tournament

Team Member :
Adam Adam, Antho Bertiyawan, Ahmad Grahari, Heryanto Heryanto, Ramzil Huda, Didi Irwadi, Veleg Krisnawan, Herlambang Maruf, Mahfud Nurcahyadi, Muhammad Riviansyah, Septiohadi Septiohadi, Wahyu Ardyanto.

Preliminary Round – Group C

|}

Placement for 9th -16th Place – Group G

|}

Weightlifting 

Men

Women

Wrestling

Men

Wushu

Men's Taolu

Men's Sanshou

Women's Taolu

Women's Sanshou

References 
Official Website
2010 Asian Games's Schedules & Results 
Indonesia's Number of Entries 
Indonesia's Medals Page 

Nations at the 2010 Asian Games
2010
Asian Games